Arcangiolo Spedalieri (1779–1823) was an Italian academic physician, who served as professor of anatomy and comparative physiology at Pavia and published on the topic.

Born in Bronte, Sicily, he was the nephew of the liberal priest and political philosopher Niccolo Spedalieri. Arcangiolo studied in Naples. During the revolution of 1799, he was forced to find asylum in Bologna, where he briefly served as a professor of clinical medicine. He then moved to work in Pavia under Giuseppe Jacopi (1779-1813), as professor of anatomy and comparative physiology at the University of Pavia. He died in Alcamo, Sicily, in 1823.

References

External links 
 

1779 births
1823 deaths
19th-century Italian physicians
19th-century Italian writers